Apuleia is a genus of flowering plants in the family Fabaceae. It belongs to the subfamily Dialioideae.

References

Dialioideae
Fabaceae genera
Taxa named by Joseph Gaertner